Daniel Kearns may refer to:

 Daniel Kearns (footballer) (born 1991), Irish footballer
 Daniel Kearns (designer) (born 1975), Irish menswear designer
 Daniel F. Kearns (1896–1963), American military aviator